Oscar Cornelius Givens (July 5, 1922 – October 22, 1967), nicknamed "Gibby", was an American Negro league infielder in the 1940s.

A native of Elizabeth, New Jersey, Givens attended Linden High School and Morgan State College. He played for the Newark Eagles during their 1946 Negro World Series championship season, and played for the club again in 1948. Givens died in Lyons, New Jersey in 1967 at age 45.

References

External links
 and Seamheads

1922 births
1967 deaths
Linden High School (New Jersey) alumni
Morgan State Bears baseball players
Newark Eagles players
People from Linden, New Jersey
Sportspeople from Elizabeth, New Jersey
20th-century African-American sportspeople
Baseball infielders